Philipp van Limborch (19 June 1633 – 30 April 1712) was a Dutch Remonstrant theologian.

Biography
Limborch was born on 19 June 1633 in Amsterdam, where his father was a lawyer. He received his education at Utrecht, at Leiden, in his native city, and finally at Utrecht University, which he entered in 1652. In 1657 he became a Remonstrant pastor at Gouda, and in 1667 he was transferred to Amsterdam, where, in the following year, the office of professor of theology in the Remonstrant seminary was added to his pastoral charge. He was a friend of John Locke, whose A Letter Concerning Toleration was likely addressed to, and first published by, Philipp van Limborch. He died in Amsterdam on 30 April 1712.

Theology
In theology, Limborch diverged radically from Jacobus Arminius and Arminianism. He embraced Rationalism and Semi-Pelagianism. Practically he didn't believe in total depravity, and assimilated prevenient grace to common grace.

Works
His most important work, Institutiones theologiae christianae, ad praxin pietatis et promotionem pacis, christianae unice directae (Amsterdam, 1686, 5th ed., 1735), is a full and clear exposition of the system of Simon Episcopius and Stephan Curcellaeus. The fourth edition (1715) included a posthumous Relatio historica de origine et progressu controversiarum in foederato Belgio de praedestinatione.

Limborch also wrote:
De veritate religionis Christianae amica collatio cum erudito Judaeo (Gouda, 1687) (the "erudite Jew" in question was Isaac Orobio de Castro)
Historia Inquisitionis (1692), in four books prefixed to the Liber Sententiarum Inquisitionis Tolosanae (1308–1323)
Commentarius in Acta Apostolorum et in Epistolas ad Romanos et ad Hebraeos (Rotterdam, 1711)

An English translation of the Theologia was published in 1702 by William Jones (A Complete System or Body of Divinity, both Speculative and Practical, founded on Scripture and Reason, London, 1702); and a translation of the Historia Inquisitionis, by Samuel Chandler, with a large introduction concerning the rise and progress of persecution and the real and pretended causes of it prefixed, appeared in 1731. See Herzog-Hauck, Realencyklopädie.

Editorial work
In 1689 Limborch edited the compilation of Socinian Samuel Przypkowski's works in the last volume of the Bibliotheca antitrinitariorum or Bibliotheca Fratrum Polonorum of the Polish Brethren. Previous volumes had been edited after the death of Christopher Sandius by Benedykt Wiszowaty in 1684.

His editorial labors included the publication of various works of his predecessors, and of Epistolae ecclesiasticae praestantum ad eruditorum virorum (Amsterdam, 1684), chiefly, by Jacobus Arminius, Joannes Uytenbogardus, Konrad Vorstius (1569–1622), Gerhard Vossius (1577–1649), Hugo Grotius, Simon Episcopius (his grand-uncle) and Caspar Barlaeus; they are of great value for the history of Arminianism.

His edition of the Liber Sententiarum Inquisitionis Tolosanae is still considered important nowadays for its meticulous transcription of a manuscript by the Dominican inquisitor Bernard Gui long regarded as lost forever, but rediscovered in London (British Library, ms. Add. 4697). Recently a new edition has appeared (Le Livre des sentences de l'inquisiteur Bernard Gui (1308-1323) edited by Annette Palès-Gobillard (2 volumes, Paris 2003).

Notes and references

Citations

Sources
 
 
 

1633 births
1712 deaths
Christian writers
Dutch Calvinist and Reformed theologians
Dutch male writers
Remonstrants
Writers from Amsterdam
17th-century Protestant theologians